Al Salam 313 is a political organization and criminal gang of conservative Shia Iraqis in Western Europe. The gang was founded by the style of a motorcycle club by the Iraqi Mohammed Bunia in Germany. Salam 313 has members Central- and North Europe and is based on the ideology of the Iraqi Shia militia Sarāyā al-Salām (former Mahdi Army). The group intimidates Iraqi citizens in Europe who represent a Western lifestyle and oppose the Iraqi government.

Background and connections 
Mohammed Bunia is the founder and boss of Salam 313. "Al Salem" means peace; the combination of numbers is said to have a religious meaning: Shiites believe that the hidden Imam Muhammad al-Mahdi will return to earth with 313 companions. "Mahdi" is called the Redeemer, so he is seen as a kind of Messiah.

The gang has a white dove as heraldic animal in their emblem. The white dove refers to the militia of the Shiite cleric Muqtada al-Sadr, Seraya al-Salam ("peace army"). Today it is an official part of the Iraqi Army of Iraqi Armed Forces, without being entirely under control of the Iraqi government.

Gang members are known in Germany, Sweden, Denmark and the Netherlands.

Police assessment and action 
In May 2019 German police took action against Al-Salam 313, targeting 34 suspects. 800 police officers including Spezialeinsatzkommandos and officers of state security searched a total of 49 residential properties in Cologne area and the Ruhr area.

The gang is also seen in the context of Middle East family clans, involved in crime in Germany. The North Rhine-Westphalian state office of criminal investigation (LKA) saw no reason to put the merger on a par with "Outlaw Motorcycle Gangs", like "Hells Angels" and "Bandidos". The LKA also does not want to classify the group as "rocker-like".

References

Gangs in Germany
Gangs in Sweden
Gangs in the Netherlands
Arab militant groups
Anti-ISIL factions in Iraq
Iraqi insurgency (2003–2011)
Rebel groups in Iraq